The table tennis competition at the 2014 Central American and Caribbean Games was held in Veracruz, Mexico.

The tournament was scheduled to be held from 15 to 20 November at the Omega Complex.

Medal summary

Men's events

Women's events

Mixed events

Medal table

References

External links
Official Website

2014 Central American and Caribbean Games events
Central American and Caribbean Games
2014